Alexander James Ridland (3 March 1882 – 5 November 1918) was a New Zealand rugby union player. A forward, Ridland represented  at a provincial level, and was a member of the New Zealand national side, the All Blacks, in 1910. He played six matches for the All Blacks including three internationals.

Ridland was born in Invercargill in 1882 to William and Margaret Ridland, both of whom were originally from the Shetland Islands. Ridland enlisted in the New Zealand Expeditionary Force in October 1917 and embarked for Britain in May 1918. He was posted to France in September 1918 and served as a rifleman with the 1st Battalion, 3rd New Zealand Rifle Brigade. He died in France on 5 November 1918 as the result of gunshot wound to the head. He was buried at the Caudry British Cemetery.

References

1882 births
1918 deaths
Rugby union players from Invercargill
New Zealand rugby union players
New Zealand international rugby union players
Southland rugby union players
Rugby union forwards
New Zealand military personnel killed in World War I
New Zealand Military Forces personnel of World War I
New Zealand Army soldiers
Deaths by firearm in France
Burials in France